Tatjana Vasiļjeva is a Latvian snooker player. She is national champion and European champion in snooker. She was the winner of the European ladies championship in 2012.

Vasiljeva and Anna Prysazhnuka were runners-up in the 2016 Ladies European Team Snooker Championship, losing 1–4 to the Russia 1 team of Anastasia Nechaeva and Daria Sirotina in the final.

Career finals

Amateur finals

References

Female snooker players
Latvian snooker players
21st-century Latvian women
21st-century Latvian people